The first round of CONCACAF matches for 2018 FIFA World Cup qualification was played between 22 and 31 March 2015.

Format
A total of 14 teams (teams ranked 22–35 in the CONCACAF entrant list) played home-and-away over two legs. The seven winners advanced to the second round.

Seeding
The draw for the first round was held on 15 January 2015, 19:40 EST (UTC−5), at the W Hotel at Miami Beach, Florida, United States.

The seeding was based on the FIFA World Rankings of August 2014 (shown in parentheses). The 14 teams were seeded into two pots:
Pot 1 contained the teams ranked 1–7 (i.e., 22–28 in the CONCACAF entrant list).
Pot 2 contained the teams ranked 8–14 (i.e., 29–35 in the CONCACAF entrant list).

Each tie contained a team from Pot 1 and a team from Pot 2, with the order of legs decided by draw.

Note: Bolded teams qualified for the second round.

Matches
|}

Bermuda won 8–0 on aggregate and advanced to the second round against Bahamas.

Dominica won 3–2 on aggregate and advanced to the second round against British Virgin Islands.

Barbados won 4–1 on aggregate and advanced to the second round against U.S. Virgin Islands.

Saint Kitts and Nevis won 12–4 on aggregate and advanced to the second round against Turks and Caicos Islands.

Nicaragua won 8–0 on aggregate and advanced to the second round against Anguilla.

1–1 on aggregate. Belize won on the away goals rule and advanced to the second round against Dominican Republic.

Curaçao won 4–3 on aggregate and advanced to the second round against Montserrat.

Goalscorers

Notes

References

External links

Qualifiers – North, Central America and Caribbean: Round 1, FIFA.com
World Cup Qualifying – Men, CONCACAF.com

1
2014–15 in CONCACAF football
2014–15 in Caribbean football
2014–15 in Belizean football
2014–15 in Nicaraguan football